The mountain peltops (Peltops montanus) is a species of bird in the family Cracticidae.
It is found in Indonesia and Papua New Guinea.
Its natural habitats are subtropical or tropical moist lowland forests and subtropical or tropical moist montane forests.

References

Peltops
Birds described in 1921
Taxonomy articles created by Polbot
Taxa named by Erwin Stresemann